The Shopinas.com Lady Clickers were a women's volleyball team that played in the Philippine Super Liga (PSL). The team was owned by Air21 Global, Inc. and was formed from the remnants of the disbanded Generika Lifesavers.

Roster
For the 2015 PSL All-Filipino Conference:

Coaching staff
 Head coach: Ramil de Jesus
 Assistant coach(s): Noel Orcullo Benson Bocboc

Team staff
 Team manager: Jay Ferrer
 Team Utility: 

Medical Staff
 Team Physician: Filma Herbosa
 Physical Therapist: Grace Salimbao

Honors

Team

Individual

See also
 Air21 Express (originally known as Shopinas.com Clickers) - former PBA team
 F2 Logistics Cargo Movers

References

External links
 Shopinas.com Lady Clickers Page

Philippine Super Liga
Volleyball clubs established in 2015
2015 establishments in the Philippines
Women's volleyball teams in the Philippines